Two Japanese warships have borne the name Kotaka:

 , a torpedo boat launched in 1888 and stricken in 1927
 , a gunboat launched in 1930 and sunk in 1944

Imperial Japanese Navy ship names
Japanese Navy ship names